Pytho niger is a species of dead log beetle in the family Pythidae. It is found in North America.

References

Further reading

 

Tenebrionoidea
Articles created by Qbugbot
Beetles described in 1837